Conglomerate Ridge is a ridge,  long, located  east-southeast of Mount Bursik in the Soholt Peaks, Heritage Range, Ellsworth Mountains of Antarctica. It was so named from the conglomerate composition of the ridge by Gerald F. Webers, leader of the United States Antarctic Research Program Ellsworth Mountains Expedition, 1979–80.

Geology
Detailed geologic maps of the Heritage Range shows that Conglomerate Ridge consists of steeply inclined, 55 to 62 degrees, Cambrian, metasedimentary strata. In terms of increasing age, the Cambrian strata includes the Frazier Ridge, Conglomerate Ridge, Drake Icefall, and Union Glacier formations. The Frazier Ridge Formation consists mainly of fine- to medium-grained green quartzite that contains infrequent beds of green argillite and black shale. It overlies an unknown thickness of the Union Glacier Formation. Trilobite fossils from the Drake Icefall and other formations within the Heritage Group indicate that all of these units accumulated during the Middle Cambrian.

References 

Ridges of Ellsworth Land